Mohamed Mara (born 12 December 1996) is a Guinean professional footballer who plays as a forward for French  club Martigues. He made one appearance for the Guinea national team in 2016.

Club career
Born in Conakry, Guinea, Mara was in Lorient's youth teams since 2010 and signed his first professional contract with them in 2014. He made his professional debut for Lorient in a 1–0 win over Lille in September 2016. He spent a season on loan with Paris FC for the 2019-20 season. On 25 August 2020, Mara transferred to Thonon Evian.

On 29 July 2022, Mara signed with Martigues in Championnat National.

International career
Mara moved to France from Guinea when he was 13 years old. He debuted for the Guinea national team in a 2–1 2018 World Cup qualification loss to the DR Congo on 13 November 2016.

Honours 

Thonon Evian

 Championnat National 3: 2021–22

References

External links
 
 
 FC Lorient club profile

1996 births
Sportspeople from Conakry
Guinean emigrants to France
Living people
Association football forwards
Guinean footballers
Guinea international footballers
French footballers
FC Lorient players
Paris FC players
Thonon Evian Grand Genève F.C. players
FC Martigues players
Ligue 1 players
Ligue 2 players
Championnat National players
Championnat National 2 players
Championnat National 3 players